The Feud is a 1910 American silent film produced by Kalem Company and directed by Sidney Olcott.

Production notes
The film was shot in Jacksonville, Florida.

References
 The Moving Picture World, vol 6, p 227; p 298
 The New York Dramatic Mirror, February 19, 1910, p 18
 Variety, February 19, 1910
 Supplement to the Bioscope, August 8, 1912, p XXVII

External links
 AFI Catalog

 The Feud website dedicated to Sidney Olcott

1910 films
Silent American drama films
American silent short films
Films set in Florida
Films shot in Jacksonville, Florida
Films directed by Sidney Olcott
1910 short films
1910 drama films
American black-and-white films
1910s English-language films
1910s American films